Jaques of London, formerly known as John Jaques of London and Jaques and Son of London is a long-established family company that manufactures sports and game equipment.

History 
Dating itself from 1795 when Thomas Jaques, a farmer's son of French Huguenot descent, set up as a "Manufacturer of Ivory, Hardwoods, Bone, and Tunbridge Ware", the company gained a reputation for publishing games under his grandson John Jaques the younger.

The popularity of chess during World War II helped MI9 hide items in chess games sent to British and American prisoners of war, because the chess sets were made of wood, especially the Staunton chess sets by Jaques of London. The inside walls of the chess pieces box were hollowed out "...to secrete maps, currency, documents, hacksaw blades and swinger compasses." The large chess boards were perfect for supplying to prisoners "...counterfeit documents, maps, currency and other contraband." The chess pieces themselves were hollowed out and used to hold messages, compasses, maps and dye to help turn uniforms into civilian attire. The base of the piece was often screwed in with a left turn screw, so any attempt to unscrew the base normally would only make it tighter.

The company moved its offices and showroom to Edenbridge, Kent, in 2000.

Products 

 Chess – Jaques had exclusive manufacturing rights for a chess set designed by Nathaniel Cooke in 1849 and named the Staunton chess set after Howard Staunton. This set later became the official international standard.
 Reversi – the first publishers starting in 1888.
 Tiddledy-Winks – the first publishers starting in 1888.
 Snakes and Ladders –  the first publishers starting in 1888.
 Croquet – played an important role in popularising the game, producing editions of the rules in 1857, 1860, and 1864.
Clock golf – Jaques assert that they originated the game in the mid 19th century.
 Table tennis – pioneered under the names Gossima and later Ping Pong.
 Happy Families – popular card game, developed in 1851.
 Ludo – patented in England 1897.
 Shove ha'penny – is a pub game in the shuffleboard family, played predominantly in the United Kingdom.

See also
British Chess Company

References

External links 
 Jaques of London's Official site

Buildings and structures in the United Kingdom destroyed during World War II
Chess equipment manufacturers
Manufacturing companies of the United Kingdom
1795 establishments in England
British companies established in 1795